The geology of Ceres consists of the characteristics of the surface, the crust and the interior of the dwarf planet Ceres. The surface of Ceres is comparable to the surfaces of Saturn's moons Rhea and Tethys, and Uranus's moons Umbriel and Oberon.

The spectrum of Ceres is similar to that of C-type asteroids. However, since it also has spectral features of carbonates and clay minerals, which are usually absent in the spectra of other C-type asteroids, Ceres is sometimes classified as a G-type asteroid.

Ceres's surface has an albedo of 0.09, which is quite dark compared to the moons in the outer Solar System. This might be a result of the relatively high temperature of Ceres's surface, the maximum temperature with the Sun overhead was estimated from measurements to be  on 5 May 1991. In a vacuum, ice is unstable at this temperature. Material left behind by the sublimation of surface ice could explain the dark surface of Ceres compared to the icy moons of the outer Solar System.

Internal structure 

Ceres's oblateness is consistent with a differentiated body, a rocky core overlain with an icy mantle.

This 100-kilometer-thick mantle (23%–28% of Ceres by mass; 50% by volume) contains up to 200 million cubic kilometers of water, which would be more than the amount of fresh water on Earth. Also, some characteristics of its surface and history (such as its distance from the Sun, which weakened solar radiation enough to allow some fairly low-freezing-point components to be incorporated during its formation), point to the presence of volatile materials in the interior of Ceres.

It has been suggested that a remnant layer of liquid water (or muddy ocean) may have survived to the present under a layer of ice. Measurements taken by Dawn confirm that Ceres is partially differentiated and has a shape in hydrostatic equilibrium, the smallest equilibrium body known.

Orientation 
Ceres has an axial tilt of about 4°, a small part of its pole is currently not observable to Dawn. Ceres rotates once every 9 hours 4 minutes in a prograde west to east direction.

Craters 

The craters exhibit a wide range of appearances, not only in size but also in how sharp and fresh or how soft and aged they look. Large number of Cererian craters have central pits, and many have central peaks. The central peak is like a snapshot, preserving a violent moment in the formation of the crater. By correlating the presence or absence of central peaks with the sizes of the craters, scientists can infer properties of Ceres’ crust, such as how strong it is. Rather than a peak at the center, some craters contain large pits, depressions that may be a result of gases escaping after the impact.

Surface of Ceres has a large number of craters with low relief, indicating that they lie over a relatively soft surface, probably of water ice. Kerwan crater is extremely low relief, with a diameter of 283.88 kilometers, reminiscent of large, flat craters on Tethys and Iapetus. It is distinctly shallow for its size, and lacks a central peak, which may have been destroyed by a 15-kilometer-wide crater at the center. The crater is likely to be old relative to the rest of Ceres's surface, because it is overlapped by nearly every other feature in the area.

Faculae 
Several bright surface features were discovered on the dwarf planet Ceres by the Dawn spacecraft in 2015. The brightest spot is located in the middle of Occator crater, and is called "bright spot 5". 130 bright areas have been discovered on Ceres, which are thought to be salt or ammonia-rich clays.

Scientists reported that the bright spots on Ceres may be related to a type of salt on 9 December 2015, particularly a form of brine containing magnesium sulfate hexahydrite (MgSO4·6H2O); the spots were also found to be associated with ammonia-rich clays.

Canyons 

Many long, straight or gently curved canyons has been found by Dawn. Geologists have yet to determine how they formed, and it is likely that several different mechanisms are responsible. Some of these might turn out to be the result of the crust of Ceres shrinking as the heat and other energy accumulated upon formation gradually radiated into space. When the behemoth slowly cooled, stresses could have fractured the rocky, icy ground. Others might have been produced as part of the devastation when a space rock crashed, rupturing the terrain.

Montes 

The best known mons on Ceres is Ahuna Mons, a cryovolcano about 6 kilometers high and 15 kilometers wide at the base. It was discovered on images taken by the Dawn spacecraft in orbit around Ceres in 2015.

Bright streaks run top to bottom on its slopes; these streaks are thought to be salt, similar to the better known Cererian bright spots. The low crater count on Ahuna mons suggests that the cryovolcano could be no older than 200 million years, and indeed models of plastic relaxation of ice at the latitude of Ahuna Mons is consistent with that age.

There are twenty-two identified montes on Ceres. Most of these have relaxed substantially over time, and it was only after modeling of the expected shapes of old cryovolcanoes that they were identified. It has been calculated that Ceres averages one such cryovolcano every 50 million years. Yamor Mons (previously named Ysolo Mons), near the north pole, has a diameter of 16 km and is the only other Cererian with the shape of Ahuna Mons, though old and battered, the cold temperatures at the pole have preserved its shape. Liberalia Mons is near the equator and has a diameter of 90 km.

Gallery

Maps

References

Further reading

Ceres
Ceres (dwarf planet)